Mickey's Big Game Hunt is a 1928 silent short film in Larry Darmour's Mickey McGuire series starring a young Mickey Rooney. Directed by Albert Herman, the two-reel short was released to theaters on December 23, 1928 by FBO.

Plot
Mickey and the Scorpions decide to go on a big game hunt. The kids go out into the woods, only find themselves up against real wild animals (actually escaped animals from a zoo).

Notes
This is one of the few known silent shorts with Billy Barty portraying the role of 'Mickey's Kid Brudder'. He would appear throughout most of the sound era of the series as 'Billy McGuire'.

Cast
Mickey Rooney - Mickey McGuire
Jimmy Robinson - Hambone Johnson
Billy Barty - Mickey's Kid Brudder
Delia Bogard - Tomboy Taylor
Marvin Stephens - Katrink
Buddy Brown - Stinkie Davis
Kendall McComas - Scorpions member

External links 
 

1928 films
1928 comedy films
American black-and-white films
American silent short films
Mickey McGuire short film series
1928 short films
Silent American comedy films
American comedy short films
1920s American films